Dudhani refers to a municipal council in Maharashtra, India

It also refers to:
Dudhani, Dumka, a census town in Jharkhand, India